Tatree Seeha (born January 7, 1983) is a Thai professional footballer who plays as a right winger for Thai League 3 club Nakhon Ratchasima United.

External links

1983 births
Living people
Tatree Seeha
Tatree Seeha
Association football forwards
Tatree Seeha
Tatree Seeha
Tatree Seeha
Tatree Seeha
Tatree Seeha
Tatree Seeha
Tatree Seeha